The Pierce Engine Company of Racine, Wisconsin, was the manufacturer of the brass era Pierce-Racine automobile. The company was founded in 1892 and produced automobiles from 1904 to 1910.

History

Andrew J. Pierce arrived in Racine, Wisconsin in 1887, and by 1892 he had organized the Racine Gas Engine Company, which then became the Pierce Gas Engine Company located at 1952 Clark Street. Stationary and marine engines were the company’s primary products, Pierce also produced to order lake launches to be powered by their marine engines. In 1895 Pierce began experimenting with horseless carriages by motorizing a surrey. He continued experimenting over the next several years, until in 1903 a small two-seat runabout was produced in series for Mitchell Motor Car Company across town. 

The runabout was equipped with a one-cylinder engine with 8-hp (5.9 kW). The following year, Pierce entered automobile production selling the runabout as a Pierce-Racine.  In 1905 Pierce added two-cylinder cars and a four-cylinder car were added in 1906. 

By March 1906, the company had four models including:
Model A-3, a 12-horsepower, 2-cylinder Runabout priced at $750, ; 
Model A-4, a 14-horsepower, 2-cylinder Light Touring Car priced at $850;
Model B2, a 16-horsepower, 2-cylinder Light Touring Car priced at $1,150;
Model C, a 24-horsepower, 4-cylinder Touring Car priced at $1,750, .

New York agents were Gantert & Paul at 60-62 West 116th Street and New England agents were Butler Motor Car Company of 995 Boylston Street in Boston.

Beginning in 1907 Pierce-Racine's were sold as a single Model D 40hp automobile priced at $2,600.  Model D would be improved as the Model E, G and H up to 1909, now with a 45-hp engine, priced at $2,000, . In 1909 the Pierce Engine Company was reorganized with J. I. Case Company investors as the Pierce Motor Company.  On August 4th 1910, Pierce Motor Company was absorbed by the J. I. Case Threshing Machine Company and the Pierce-Racine became the Case automobile. Case automobiles were produced until 1927.

Advertisements

See also 
 Stahl Automobile Museum - 1906 Pierce-Racine Model D
 1906 Pierce-Racine Model D at ConceptCarz
 Racine County Eye article - Pierce Gas Engine Company
 Detroit Public Library images of Pierce-Racines

References

Defunct motor vehicle manufacturers of the United States
Vehicle manufacturing companies established in 1904
Vehicle manufacturing companies disestablished in 1909
Companies based in Racine, Wisconsin
1904 establishments in Wisconsin
1909 disestablishments in Wisconsin
Defunct manufacturing companies based in Wisconsin
Veteran vehicles
Brass Era vehicles
1900s cars
Motor vehicle manufacturers based in Wisconsin
Cars introduced in 1904